The Columbian Squires is an international youth fraternity run by the Knights of Columbus for Catholic boys between the ages of 10 and 18. Its stated mission is "to develop young men as leaders who understand their Catholic religion, who have a strong commitment to the Church and who are ready, willing and capable of patterning their lives after the Youth Christ."

History 
The Squires were established under the direction of Brother Barnabas McDonald, F.S.C., together with Supreme Director Daniel A. Tobin on August 4, 1925. At that time there was a national interest in youth in the United States, as reflected by the development of the Boy Scouts of America and the Big Brother movement.

The Boy Movement Committee of the Supreme Council of the Knights of Columbus sent questionnaires to each Grand Knight and after receiving the responses met with Brother Barnabas. Brother Barnabas had gained a national reputation for his pioneering work with delinquents and orphans.

As of 2016, the formation of new Squire Circles in the United States and Canada is discouraged, since the Catholic Church has a desire to move youth activities from exclusive clubs into the local parish youth groups.

Organization 

Each Circle is supervised by a Knights of Columbus Council or Assembly and has an advisory board made up of either the Grand Knight, the Deputy Grand Knight and Chaplain or the Faithful Navigator, the Faithful Captain and Faithful Friar.  Circles are either Council based, parish based, or school based, depending on the location of the circle and the Knight counselors.

The Squires officers consist of Chief Squire, Deputy Chief Squire, Bursar Squire, Notary Squire, Marshall, Sentry, Arm Captain and Pole Captain. Adults (members of the Knights of Columbus) fill the roles of Chief Counselor, Chancellor and the priest fills the role of the Father Prior.

Squires circles have been instituted throughout the United States, Canada, Mexico, the Philippines, Cuba, Panama, Guatemala, Puerto Rico, the Bahamas, the Virgin Islands, Guam, and various United States Air Force bases abroad.

Sister Organization 
In 1996 the Virginia State Council of Knights of Columbus endorsed the Squire Roses as the official youth group for girls aged 10 to 18, in the Commonwealth of Virginia. Since then the Squire Roses have expanded into new Knights of Columbus jurisdictions, growing in both size and stature. The Squire Roses have their own ceremonials, logo, and slogan, each similar yet distinct from the Squires.

In Canada, the Squire Roses are called Squirettes.

See also

References

External links 
 Knights of Columbus – Columbian Squires Web Site
 Squires Newsletter
 Ontario Provincial Board
 Michigan Columbian Squires
 Harker Heights, Texas Columbian Squires Circle 5022

Knights of Columbus
Catholic youth organizations
Youth organizations established in 1925
Child-related organizations in the United States